"Pretend" is a song by American singer Tinashe. It was released as her second single from her debut album Aquarius. The song, which was produced by producer Detail, features a guest verse from Harlem-based rapper ASAP Rocky.

Composition

In an interview with Rap-Up, Tinashe talked about the concept behind the song. She said “The song with Rocky is definitely kind of a contemporary-sounding song, it doesn’t really sound like a lot of other songs on the radio, but it’s a midtempo feel and it’s kinda minimalistic in the track.” And when speaking about the song's meaning, she said, ""Pretend" is basically about when you're in a relationship and instead of dealing with the stuff that you deal with in a relationship, you don't want to do that. You're just going to pretend that everything is fine. I think a lot of people can relate."

"Pretend" is a pop song written by Tinashe, Lyrica Anderson and ASAP Rocky and was produced by Detail.

Release and critical reception
"Pretend" premiered on August 22, 2014 online.

Exclaim! editor Gregory Adams complimented the singers vocals saying "Her voice builds up to an emotional cry in the chorus, which finds her praising the concept of "a love that never ends." Chris DeVille from Stereogum was less vocal about ASAP Rocky's appearance on the song but praised Tinashe by saying "her performance is the showstopper here."

Music video
The song's official music video, directed by Jodeb, was shot on August 19, 2014 and released on September 29, 2014.

Credits and personnel
Recording locations
Tinashe's vocals mixed at Larrabee Sound Studios, North Hollywood, Los Angeles
ASAP Rocky's vocals recorded and mixed at Clockwork Studios, Los Angeles
Mastered at The Mastering Palace, New York City

Personnel

Tinashe – songwriter, lead vocals
ASAP Rocky – songwriter, guest vocals
Detail – songwriter, producer
The Order – songwriter, producer
Lyrica Anderson – songwriter
Héctor el Father – recording, mixing
Geebizzy – recording assistant, mixing assistant
Jaycen Joshua – mixing
Ryan Kaul – mixing assistant
Maddox Chimm – mixing assistant
Contains a sample from "Action", as performed by Orange Krush
Dave Kutch – mastering

Credits adapted from the liner notes of Aquarius.

Track listing
Digital download
"Pretend" (featuring ASAP Rocky) – 3:52

Digital download
"Pretend Remix" (featuring Jeezy) – 4:16

Digital download
"Pretend" (Dave Audé Remix) – 3:40

Charts

Release history

References

2014 songs
2014 singles
ASAP Rocky songs
Songs written by ASAP Rocky
RCA Records singles
Song recordings produced by Detail (record producer)
Songs written by Lyrica Anderson
Tinashe songs
Songs written by Tinashe
Songs written by Detail (record producer)
Songs written by Dre Moon